St. Michael's Hospital is a teaching hospital and medical centre in Toronto, Ontario, Canada. It was established by the Sisters of St. Joseph in 1892 with the founding goal of taking care of the sick and the poor of Toronto's inner city. The hospital provides tertiary and quaternary services in cardiovascular surgery, neurosurgery, inner city health, and therapeutic endoscopy. It is one of two Level 1 adult trauma centres in Greater Toronto, along with the larger Sunnybrook Health Sciences Centre. As trauma centres, both St. Michael's and Sunnybrook are equipped with helipads. It is one of several teaching hospitals of the University of Toronto Faculty of Medicine and is part of the Unity Health Toronto hospital network.

Overview
The hospital is located near the intersection of Queen Street West and Yonge Street, in Downtown Toronto's Garden District. The hospital serves a diverse population, which includes the affluent condominium complexes in Harbourfront, the underprivileged of the inner city of Regent Park, and the gay and lesbian community in Church and Wellesley. The hospital has 463 inpatient beds and extensive outpatient clinics.

The physician-in-chief is Dr. Sharon Straus, the surgeon-in-chief is Dr. Najma Ahmed, the vice-president of research and innovation is Dr. Ori Rotstein, and the president and CEO is Dr. Tim Rutledge. The hospital also has a large team of volunteers. The hospital absorbed the Wellesley endoscopy group after the closure of Wellesley Hospital.

Documentary filmmaker Katerina Cizek teamed up with frontline health care workers at the hospital in the National Film Board of Canada's filmmaker-in-residence project, which received the 2008 Webby Award for the best online documentary series.

In October 2008, St. Michael's was named one of Greater Toronto's Top Employers by Mediacorp Canada Inc., which was announced by the Toronto Star newspaper. The hospital was also named one of the Best Employers for New Canadians for six consecutive years, from 2008 to 2013.

History

St. Michael's Hospital was founded in 1892 by the Sisters of St. Joseph, who operated the Notre Dame des Anges, a boarding house for working women. Originally an old Baptist church, the hospital on Bond Street was created in response to care for the poor population in the south end of Toronto.

The hospital opened with a bed capacity of 26 and a staff of six doctors and four graduate nurses. Within a year, it was expanded to include two large wards and an emergency department.

As early as 1894, St. Michael's Hospital started receiving medical students. It negotiated a formal agreement with the Faculty of Medicine at the University of Toronto in 1920 that has continued to this day.

By 1912, the hospital's bed capacity had reached 300, and a five-room operating suite was added. The ongoing physical expansion, most prominently in the 1960s, increased the original 26-bed facility to 900 beds.

Between 1892 and 1974, St. Michael's school of nursing graduated 81 classes, totalling 5,177 graduates. The school was closed in 1974, when nursing education was moved into the province's community college system. Thereafter, the hospital opened a school for medical record librarians, the first in Canada, and participated in the preparation of dietitians and X-ray and laboratory technologists.

In March 2010, the hospital re-branded itself to simply St. Michael's to reflect its growing movement into medical research. Meanwhile, a new motto ("Inspired Care. Inspiring Science.") was also revealed.

On 1 August 2017, St. Michael's Hospital merged with St. Joseph's Health Centre and Providence Healthcare to form a new hospital network.

Construction
St. Michael's is undergoing major renovations. Most of the construction is taking place at the corner of Queen and Victoria Streets to build the 17-storey Peter Gilgan Patient Care Tower. Construction began in April 2015 and is expected to be completed in 2018. The 250,000-square-foot addition will boast a new main entrance and an emergency department nearly twice size.

Services
 Chiropody
 Chiropractic
 Coronary care unit
 Critical care
 Diabetes comprehensive care
 Vitreoretinal surgery
 Heart and vascular disease
 Inner city health
 Neurology and musculoskeletal disorders
 Obstetrics and gynecology
 Pediatrics 
 Psychiatry
 Specialized Complex Care
 Trauma and neurosurgery
 General Surgery and Acute Care Surgery
 Advanced Colorectal Surgery
 Complex Surgical Oncology
 Breast Surgery
 Minimally Invasive Surgery
 Therapeutic Endoscopy

The hospital is also home to the Li Ka Shing Knowledge Institute, with a state-of-the-art building, opened on October 18, 2011. The Knowledge Institute aims to bring together the areas of research and education to bring advances to patient care sooner. It is also the home of the Toronto Platelet Immunobiology Group, a group of scientists and physicians that perform research in platelet and bleeding disorders.

St. Michael's is one of a few GTA hospitals with helicopter landing facilities and one of two in downtown Toronto (the other is at the Hospital for Sick Children). The helipad  is located on the roof of the main hospital wing in the north end at Shuter Street and Victoria Street.

References

External links

Hospitals in Toronto
Hospitals affiliated with the University of Toronto
Catholic hospitals in North America
Hospital buildings completed in 1892
Hospitals established in 1892
Art Deco architecture in Canada
Heliports in Ontario
Certified airports in Ontario